Randolph Royall Claiborne Jr. (November 7, 1906 - February 22, 1986) was the 5th bishop of the Episcopal Diocese of Atlanta, elected in 1952. Previously he had served as Bishop Suffragan in the Episcopal Diocese of Alabama.

Background

Randolph was born November 7, 1906, to the Reverend Randolph Royall Claiborne, vicar of the Episcopal Church in Farmville, Virginia, and Mary Thomas Clark.  The Claiborne family moved to Marietta, Georgia, where Randolph Sr. would serve as Rector at St James' Church.

Randolph Jr. attended the University of Virginia, receiving his bachelor's degree in 1928. He then attended Virginia Theological Seminary in Alexandria, receiving his Master of Divinity in 1931. He was ordained deacon in June 1931 by Bishop Gravatt and priest in January 1932 by Bishop Mikell. From 1932 to 1938, he served as Rector of St James' Church, Macon, Georgia. From there he moved to Church of the Nativity in Huntsville, Alabama, serving from 1938 to 1949 as rector.

In 1949, he was elected bishop suffragan of Alabama. In 1952, he was chosen to serve as the fifth bishop of Atlanta. He was installed as diocesan bishop at a service held in St. Peter's Church in Rome, Georgia. According to C.J. Wyatt's history of St. Peter's Church this was so that he could say he had been consecrated at "St. Peter's in Rome." Bishop Clairborne told the Annual Council Meeting of the diocese that met the weekend of his consecration of his connections to the previous bishops. Wyatt writes:"Every Bishop of Atlanta had been my friend." Bishop Nelson had often visited his home during the Georgia ministry of his father; Bishop Mikell had been "an inspiration during the days of my youth" and later. Bishop Walker was the examining chaplain who certified him for ordination. Bishop Walthour "became my friend during the years in which we both took Holy Orders."

He married Clara Virginia Kinney Stribling on June 9, 1953. Bishop Claiborne retired in 1972, and was given the title "Bishop Emeritus" in honor of his 20-year service to the diocese.

Consecrators

 Henry St. G. Tucker, 19th Presiding Bishop of the Episcopal Church
 Charles C. J. Carpenter 6th bishop of Alabama
 Noble C. Powell, 9th bishop of Maryland
Randolph Claiborne was the 489th bishop consecrated in the Episcopal Church.

See also

 List of Succession of Bishops for the Episcopal Church, USA

References

 Atlanta Diocese Centennial History page on Bishop Claiborne.
 The Episcopal Church Annual. Morehouse Publishing: New York, NY (2005).
 Upon This Rock: 150 Years in the Life of St. Peter's Church, Rome, Georgia by Dr. C. J. Wyatt Jr. St. Peter's Church: Rome, GA (1994).

1906 births
1986 deaths
People from Huntsville, Alabama
People from Macon, Georgia
People from Farmville, Virginia
Episcopal bishops of Atlanta
University of Virginia alumni
Virginia Theological Seminary alumni
20th-century American Episcopalians